A sodium channel opener is a type of drug which facilitates ion transmission through sodium channels.

Examples include toxins, such as aconitine, veratridine, batrachotoxin, robustoxin, palytoxin and ciguatoxins and insecticides (DDT and pyrethroids), which activate voltage-gated sodium channels (VGSCs), and solnatide (AP301), which activates the epithelial sodium channel (ENaC).

See also
 Sodium channel blocker

References

Ion channel openers
Sodium channels